Breathing Under Water is an album by Anoushka Shankar and Karsh Kale released on 28 August 2007. Shankar and Kale expand beyond cultural and traditional borders of music with this collaboration. With the help of featured guests Ravi Shankar, Sting, Norah Jones, Midival Punditz, Salim Merchant, Vishwa Mohan Bhatt and others, the duo blended Indian classical music, electronica, dance and folk styles.

Track listing

Personnel 
Musicians
 Anoushka Shankar – synthesizer, piano, keyboards, sitar, tanpura
 Karsh Kale – synthesizer, acoustic guitar, bass, piano, electric bass, cymbals, drums, electric guitar, keyboards, tabla, vocals, snare drums, electronic percussion, orchestral percussion
 Ravi Shankar – sitar
 Vishwa Mohan Bhatt – mohan veena
 Pedro Eustache – flute
 Sting – vocals 
 Shankar Mahadevan: vocals
 Norah Jones – piano, vocals 
 Pirashanna Thevarajah – mridangam, kanjira, moorsing
 Vishal Vaid – vocals
 Salim Merchant – piano, keyboards
 Sunidhi Chauhan – vocals
 Ravi Shankar – guest appearance

Technical personnel
 John Stewart – engineering
 Greg Calbi – mastering
 Herbert Waltl – executive production
 Gordon Jee – art direction
 Anoushka Shankar – arrangements, production, string arrangements
 Saul Williams – author
 Brian Montgomery – engineering
 Karsh Kale – arrangements, production, string arrangements, drum programming
 Gaurav Raina – programming, production, engineering, atmosphere
 Salim Merchant – arrangements, production, string arrangements
 Chad Lupo – assistant arranger
 Jayant Luthra – programming
 Jonathan Dagan – engineering

Charts

References

Anoushka Shankar albums
2007 albums